The 6th Rocket Brigade was a Tactical ballistic missile brigade of the Soviet Army. The brigade was activated in 1962 with the 6th  Army and disbanded in 1998.

History 
The 6th Missile Brigade was activated in 1962 at Pinozero with the 6th Army. It included three separate missile battalions and a technical battery. It was equipped with R-11 Zemlya (SS-1B Scud A) tactical ballistic missiles. In December 1991, the brigade received newer OTR-21 Tochka tactical ballistic missiles. The brigade was disbanded in 1998.

References 

Theatre rocket brigades of the Soviet Union
06
Military units and formations established in 1962
Military units and formations disestablished in 1998